The Palisade and Regent Apartments are two historic buildings in Lincoln, Nebraska. The five-story Palisade built in 1928, followed by the four-story Regent in 1929. They were both built by Harry Golstein, and designed in the Period Revival style. They have been listed on the National Register of Historic Places since March 5, 1998.

References

Apartment buildings in Nebraska
National Register of Historic Places in Lincoln, Nebraska
Residential buildings completed in 1928
1928 establishments in Nebraska